Sunara Begum (born 22 September 1984) is an English visual and performance artist, filmmaker, photographer and writer of Bangladeshi descent. She uses installation, film, photography, live performance, sonics and text. Begum is the founder and director of Chand Aftara, a creation centre. Begum is also the co-founder of Living Legacies, a traditional music archive in Gambia and New Horizons Africa, a music and arts festival in Lagos, Nigeria.

Early life
Begum was born in London, England. She was encouraged to pursue the visual arts by her mother, who from an early age would recite stories of growing up in the villages of Bangladesh. Begum is of Bangladeshi descent and was brought up with the traditions of her native Bangladesh in a Sufi-Muslim household.

She began her studies at Camberwell College of Arts. In 2008, she graduated from Central St Martins College of Art and Design where she completed BA in Fine Art and MFA in Fine Art. Whilst at Central St Martins College, she spent much of her time recording various visual projects on both abstract and narrative based subject matter, in order to extract, explore and express her artistic vision, primarily through photography and film. During her studies Begum did several apprenticeships with renowned international visual artists, as well as working as archivist for the Henry Moore Foundation and as research assistant, camera operator and line producer for Halaqah Media.

Career

Art
Begum had her first exhibition at the National Annexe Gallery (2004) as part of a group show in Cape Town, South Africa while still at St Martins. Since then, her solo exhibitions include; Whitespace Gallery (2016, Nigeria), Dimbola Museum & Gallery (2016, UK), Lionel Wendt Gallery (2015, Sri Lanka), Centre for Contemporary Art (2015, Nigeria), St. Martin in the Fields (2014, UK), Khalili Lecture Theatre SOAS (2013, UK), St. Martin in the Fields (2012, UK), Drik Gallery (2011, Bangladesh), 198 Gallery (2010, UK), Departure (2009, UK), Shoreditch Gallery (2008, UK), East-Side Educational Trust (2007, UK), Brady Arts Centre (2007, UK).

She has collaborated with a wide range of practitioners from the visual arts, music and dance including multi-media artist Trevor Mathison, spoken word artist HKB FiNN, classical composer Tunde Jegede and dancer/choreographer Bode Lawal.

As a visual artist she has exhibited extensively in galleries across UK and internationally in Europe, Asia and Africa. From October to November 2010, she exhibited Ara: A New Face of the Old World at the 198 Gallery in London.

As a photographer her work has been published in France, UK, China, India and Bangladesh, in magazines and newspapers including Songlines, Le Monde, and L'Parisian. In September 2010, her first book The Legend of Ara was published, the book is a photographic poetic narrative of a mythical character. Her approach to photography contextualises people, places and environments and as an artist she considers herself a Visual-Anthro-Mythologist.

Film
Begum has also been involved in theatre productions, film and television. She has worked as a producer and cinematographer on several films including The Idea and the award-winning feature film 500 Years Later. She directed her own debut short film Ara's Sojourn to critical acclaim. This featured her sister, Shahanara Begum. This has been followed by several short films and feature documentaries. Memories of My Mentor (2017) was written, produced and directed by Sunara Begum. In 2016 Truth & Art was screened at the Lights, Camera Africa!!! film festival in Lagos, Nigeria. In 2015 Truth & Art was selected to appear at the 5th Annual Africa International Film Festival (AFRIFF) in Lagos, in November 2015. New Horizons Africa (2016), New Horizons Africa (2015), Night Paintings (2014), The Pilgrim Within (2013), a documentary series entitled, Truth & Art (2013) featuring three international artists from three continents, Visions of a Traveller (2012), The Brodsky Quartet (2012), Nomadic Mystics (2012), African Classical Music (2012), The Water's Will (2011), One Take Wonders (2011), Ara Trilogy (2010), When Night Falls (2010), The Road to Basilique (2010), The World of Tunde Jegede (2010), Menantol (2009), Ara's World (2008), Ara's Sojourn (2007), Our Story Our Voice (2007), The Idea (2006), Justice for the Youth (2002).

Begum has continued to develop her own visual narrative-led language on many large-scale projects for productions including, Ancient Futures which has toured internationally, African Messiah at the Royal Opera House, London, Visions of a Traveller at Lyon Opera House and The Planetarium for La Musée des Confluence in Lyon.

In 2006, Begum founded Chand Aftara, an audio-visual production company which was initially set up to document untold stories through films and documentaries. It is now an interdisciplinary arts organisation that works on international exhibitions, screenings, theatre productions and publishing. It works to develop and harness cultural initiatives centered on the Indian subcontinent and Africa, and it is based in London.

Stage
Begum has also been involved in stage productions for Talawa Theatre Company both as an actress and in stage management. In 2002, she made her debut performance as an actress on Wide Asleep which was a collection of personal narratives woven together using movement, spoken word, photography and dance, it was performed at Arcola Theatre in London. In 2003, she worked as photographer and stage manager on an experimental piece entitled Pace which was performed by an ensemble at London's Soho Theatre and Tabernacle Arts Centre. In 2004, she worked on an interdisciplinary piece called Reach which was performed at Drill Hall Theatre.

In 2008, Begum worked as producer on a new interpretation of Federico García Lorca's Blood Wedding which was performed at Departure Arts Centre. In 2013, she worked on live multimedia visuals, costume and stage design for the theatre production The Griot's Tale which was performed at Yinka Shonibare's studio followed by a two-week run at the Africa Centre, London in 2013 and was part of the first Africa Centre Summer Festival Covent Garden Piazza in London. The Griot's Tale is an inter-disciplinary collaboration featuring actor and storyteller Patrice Naiambana and was written and directed by composer and musician Tunde Jegede. In 2014 Begum worked closely with Tunde Jegede on a new conception entitled, Emidy: He Who Dared To Dream, the life and story of an African Slave who became a composer and virtuoso violinist in C19 England. The piece was initially developed through a month long artist residency at Yinka Shonibare's studio and further developed at Abbaye Royale de Fontevraud in France in 2016. Emidy: He Who Dared To Dream, then went on to tour France and UK in 2017 at the following venues, La Cave Poésie, Tara Theatre, Lyric Theatre and Theatre Utopia.

Community work
In 2011, Begum founded the Chand Aftara Village Teaching Project, where she combines her art forms to share her growing expertise with young people around the world. She offers multi-sensory workshops across continents in UK, Bangladesh, India, Gambia and Morocco with the primary aim of exploring a variety of stimuli and approaches to creating movement, written text, music and visuals individually and in groups. Begum works with a team of visual, sound and movement artists to deliver cross disciplinary workshops that can cater for the needs of a broad range of people, places and environments and to engage global communities.

Healing sessions 
Begum runs sound baths across UK, a healing therapy that uses sound to induce a meditative state. Her sound bath healing sessions are an improvised meditative concert that supports states of deep relaxation, where stress release and healing can occur. This experience can provide many of meditation's benefits, without the discipline—such as increased focus and clarity, decreased anxiety, stress relief, and a heightened capacity for empathy. It is an acoustic sound healing journey that relaxes the mind and activates the body's natural energetic healing system. It incorporates yoga movements, healing sounds, vocal toning, singing bowls, planetary gongs, drums, aromatherapy, meditation and other healing tools to transform the nervous system ultimately relieving stress and stagnant energy blocks. In 2020 Begum founded Sister's Circle, a monthly moon meet for women to come together to share creativity through storytelling, movement, music and herbs.

Style
Begum uses installation, film, photography and text, and has created her own distinct visual language and aesthetic. Her work combines cinematography and storytelling. Her main interest is the visual arts.

Her work is influenced by East and West, and predominantly explores the relationship between people and their environment with themes of migration, exile, memory, identity, gender and femininity as seen in myth, divinity, both historical and contemporary. She draws her influences from the natural world, figurative painting, religious iconography, mystical philosophies and the cultures in which she was raised. The stories together with her own personal experiences are the cultural axis of her work.

Personal life
Begum lives and works in London. She spends much of her time in West Africa working on New Horizons Africa (co-founder), an international music and arts initiative based in Lagos, Nigeria and Living Legacies (co-founder), a traditional music archive in the Gambia. Begum divides her time between producing international projects and her own artistic practice as a visual and performance artist. She is the founder of Studio Chand Aftara, an artist's collective dedicated to the exhibition and production of experimental cinema and a space of cultivation, archive for radical, anti-colonial wellness. Her work has been widely exhibited in film festivals, museums, galleries and cinematheques worldwide. Begum is a regular practitioner of yoga, meditation and the healing arts and often visits solitary retreats in UK, India and West Africa. She is a pescatarian and fasts twice a week, a practice that has been passed down from her mother.

Filmography

Film

Performance / Stage

Novels, CD & DVD

See also
 British Bangladeshi
 List of British Bangladeshis

References

External links
 
 
 
 Sunara Begum on Songkick

1984 births
Living people
English Muslims
English Sufis
English people of Bangladeshi descent
English contemporary artists
English women photographers
English film producers
English women novelists
British Asian writers
English stage actresses
21st-century English women writers
21st-century English actresses
Artists from London
Film directors from London
Writers from London
Actresses from London
People from the London Borough of Islington
Alumni of Camberwell College of Arts
Alumni of Central Saint Martins
21st-century women photographers
20th-century Bengalis
21st-century Bengalis
20th-century English women
20th-century English people